'Bing Crosby Sings the Song Hits from... is a Decca Records album by Bing Crosby featuring songs from recent Broadway musicals issued as a 10” LP issued as catalog No. DL5298  and as a 4-disc 78rpm box set (A-805) and as a 4-disc 45rpm set (9-144).

Reception
The sides were issued as singles also and received warm reviews from Billboard. Looking at "The Big Movie Show in the Sky" they said "Pretentious production number from “Texas L’il Darlin’” is performed impressively by Crosby and the Morgan organization." and for "The Yodel Blues" "Bing is especially convincing with this “Texas L’il Darlin’” lilt. He’s brilliantly supported by Morgan and vocal group." "If I Were a Bell" was highlighted by the magazine in their review. "Remarkably light and happy treatment of a cleverly carved rhythm item from “Guys and Dolls” should bring in heavy returns. Patti and Bing's adroit sense of humor make this one of high spot diskings of the day."

Variety commented: "Stay Well / The Little Gray House - Bing Crosby endows this coupling from the B’way musical hit, “Lost In The Stars,” with one of his better, more relaxed and tonally rich baritonings."

The writer Will Friedwald discussing Crosby's recordings of show tunes said that "My particular favorites are a pair of songs from Kurt Weill and Maxwell Anderson’s Lost in the Stars, “Stay Well” and “The Little Gray House.”... Of all the many lesser known Crosby performances, particularly from the postwar era, these are the ones that most deserve to be heard again."

Track listing for 10" LP
Recording dates follow track titles.

References 

Bing Crosby albums
Decca Records albums
1951 albums